An infrared sauna is a type of sauna that uses infrared heaters to emit infrared light experienced as radiant heat which is absorbed by the surface of the skin. Infrared saunas are popular in alternative therapies where they are claimed to help with a number of medical issues including autism, cancer, and COVID-19, but these claims are entirely pseudoscientific. Traditional saunas differ from infrared saunas in that they heat the body primarily by conduction and convection from the heated air and by radiation of the heated surfaces in the sauna room whereas infrared saunas primarily use just radiation. Infrared saunas are also used in Infrared Therapy and Waon Therapy and although there is a small amount of preliminary evidence that these therapies correlate with a number of benefits including reduced blood pressure, increased heart rate and increased left ventricular function there are several problems with linking this evidence to alleged health benefits.

History
John Harvey Kellogg invented the use of radiant heat saunas with his incandescent electric light bath in 1891. He claimed that it stimulated healing in the body and in 1893 displayed his invention at the Chicago World's Fair. In 1896 the Radiant Heat Bath was patented by Kellogg and described in the patent as not depending on the heat in the air to heat the body but able to more quickly produce a sweat than traditional Turkish or Russian baths at a lower ambient temperature. The idea became popular, particularly in Germany where "Light Institutes" were set up. King Edward VII of England and Kaiser Wilhelm II of Germany both had radiant heat baths set up in their various palaces. The modern concept of the infrared sauna was revived in the 1970s in Japan as Waon (Japanese: "soothing warmth") Therapy and neonatal beds for newborns use infrared elements to keep the baby warm without being stifled.

Description

Infrared saunas can be designed to look like traditional saunas but cheaper models can be in the form of a tent with an infrared element inside. Infrared Saunas differ from other types of sauna such as traditional Finnish saunas mainly in the method of heat delivery. Far infrared light, which is emitted in an infrared sauna at a wavelength of around 10 μm, is felt directly by the body in the form of radiated heat without the need to heat the air around the body first. This results in a lower ambient air temperature allowing for longer sustained stays in the sauna. Infrared light also penetrates the body deeply resulting in a fast and vigorous sweat being produced. The average ambient temperature in an infrared sauna is usually 40-60°C compared to 70-90°C in traditional saunas.

Effects

A July 2009 Literature review of nine relevant papers concluded that there was:

 Limited moderate evidence supporting Far-infrared saunas (FIRS) efficacy in normalizing blood pressure and treating congestive heart failure
 Fair evidence, from a single study, supporting FIRS therapy in chronic pain
 Weak evidence, from a single study, supporting FIRS therapy in chronic fatigue syndrome
 Weak evidence, from a single study, supporting FIRS therapy for obesity
 Consistent fair evidence to refute claims regarding the role of FIRSs in cholesterol reduction

All of the studies in the review were limited by small sample sizes, short duration, unvalidated symptom scales, and the fact that they were all conducted by the same core research group.

In February of 2021 Steven Novella of Science Based Medicine commented on the quality of studies in an article entitled "Infrared Saunas for "Detoxification" he stated that: 

A November 2018 Systematic review and meta-analysis of nine clinical trials found that five weekly conventional sauna sessions for 2 to 4 weeks, was associated with a significant reduction in brain natriuretic peptide (BNP — a marker of heart failure progression) and cardiothoracic ratio (an indicator of heart enlargement), and improved left-ventricular ejection fraction, but no significant effect on left-ventricular end-diastolic diameter, left atrial diameter, systolic blood pressure, or diastolic blood pressure. The review also rated the quality of evidence for these findings as moderate to insufficient citing a risk of bias and imprecision as the reason for the low evidence rating. The evidence presented by the review supported a therapeutic effect of sauna bathing for heart failure patients but recommended that further studies were needed to be able to draw definitive conclusions.

A 2019 scientific survey found that most people use both infrared and traditional saunas for relaxation and that its use, 5 to 15 times per month, was associated with higher mental well-being.

Use in alternative therapies

There are a number of claims made about the health effects of infrared saunas that are entirely based in pseudoscience and have no evidence to support them. Fire departments in Texas and Indiana have purchased infrared saunas under the premise that they will prevent cancer and that the firefighters will be able to sweat out inhaled pollutants. Alternative therapists such as naturopaths have advised the use of infrared saunas for the treatment of Cancer and Autism. Wellness clinics have recommended it to remove radiation and heavy metals from the body as well as a preventative treatment for COVID-19. Gwyneth Paltrow has also been criticised by experts for recommending infrared saunas as a post COVID-19 treatment.

The most common claim not based on evidence is that of detoxification. Proponents of infrared saunas will often claim that because infrared light penetrates the body so deeply it must detoxify better than other means of sweat induction. Infrared saunas do indeed induce body warmth and sweat much more vigorously and at lower ambient temperatures than traditional saunas or exercise. This does not however mean that they detoxify more efficiently, or at all. Sweating removes an insignificant amount of toxins from your body and can be counter productive to the function of the body's actual detoxification system, the liver and kidneys.Producing more sweat reduces the amount of urine produced by the body which may actually reduce toxin excretion.

Kelly Conaboy of The Atlantic wrote an article on infrared saunas entitled "Infrared Saunas Will Not 'Detoxify' You". The author visited an infrared sauna multiple times and found the lower ambient temperature combined with the amount of sweat produced to be highly relaxing. While attempting to research the claims made by manufacturers and spa owners that infrared saunas detoxify the body however, she wasn't able to find anything credible. The claims made were that the sweat produced from infrared saunas will contain up to 20% toxins and that sweat from regular saunas will only contain 3% toxins.

She spoke with Dr Dee Anna Glaser who was an expert in Hyperhidrosis who said  She also said she'd never heard of sweat containing up to 20% toxins.

When Conaboy asked for evidence from the owners of the spa regarding the claim that sweat produced in infrared saunas contains 20% toxins she was directed to an industry website which made the same claim but didn't provide any source for it. She eventually found a reference to a textbook entitled "Vander's Human Physiology: The Mechanisms of Body Function by Eric P. Widmaier; Hershel Raff, Ph.D.; and Kevin T. Strang" but after reading the textbook she was still unable to find the reference to such a high amount of toxins being found in sweat. Conaboy then contacted the authors of the textbook directly to ask about the reference. They each said that the textbook does not make that claim at all. One of the authors, Kevin T. Strang was quoted as saying "I have no idea what those citing our textbook would be referencing".

See also

References

External links
Light therapeutics; a practical manual of phototherapy for the student and the practitioner, with special reference to the incandescent electric-light bath by Kellogg, John Harvey,1852-1943

Bathing
Light therapy
Energy therapies
Pseudoscience
Alternative detoxification
Fringe science
Scientific skepticism
Alternative medicine
Health fraud